Ann Bishop Roth (born October 30, 1931) is an American costume designer. She has designed the costumes of various prominent films, and has been nominated five times for the Academy Award for Best Costume Design, winning twice for; The English Patient (1996), and Ma Rainey's Black Bottom (2020).

Life and career
Roth was born in Hanover, Pennsylvania, the daughter of Eleanor and James Roth. Roth is a Carnegie Mellon graduate who began her career as a scenery painter for the Pittsburgh Opera. She intended to remain in the field of production design until she met Irene Sharaff at the Bucks County Playhouse. Sharaff invited her to California to assist her with costumes on the film Brigadoon and suggested Roth apprentice with her for five films and five Broadway productions before setting out on her own.

Her more than one hundred screen credits include The World of Henry Orient, Midnight Cowboy, Klute, Working Girl, Silkwood, The Unbearable Lightness of Being, The Mambo Kings, The Birdcage, Primary Colors, Cold Mountain, Closer, Freedomland, The Good Shepherd, Margot at the Wedding, Mamma Mia!, and Evening.

Roth's dozens of stage credits include The Odd Couple, The Star-Spangled Girl, Purlie, Seesaw, They're Playing Our Song, The Best Little Whorehouse in Texas, Biloxi Blues, Butley, The Vertical Hour, Deuce, and The Waverly Gallery.

Multiple collaborations 
 13 – Mike Nichols – Silkwood, Heartburn, Biloxi Blues, Working Girl, Postcards from the Edge, Regarding Henry,  Wolf, The Birdcage, Primary Colors, What Planet Are You From, Wit, Angels in America, and Closer 
 5 – John Schlesinger – Midnight Cowboy, The Day of the Locust, Marathon Man, Honky Tonk Freeway, & Pacific Heights
 4 – Sidney Lumet –   The Morning After, Family Business, Q&A, & A Stranger Among Us
 3 – Alan J. Pakula – Klute, Rollover, & Consenting Adults
 3 – Anthony Minghella – The English Patient & The Talented Mr. Ripley, & Cold Mountain
 3 – Stephen Daldry – The Hours, The Reader, & Extremely Loud & Incredibly Close 
 3 – Brian De Palma – Dressed to Kill, Blow Out, & The Bonfire of the Vanities
 3 – Herbert Ross – The Owl and the Pussycat, The Goodbye Girl, & California Suite 
 3 – Hal Ashby – Coming Home,  Second-Hand Hearts, & The Slugger's Wife
 3 – George Roy Hill – The World of Henry Orient, The World According to Garp, & Funny Farm
 3 – Noah Baumbach – Margot at the Wedding, While We're Young & White Noise
 2 – M. Night Shymalan – Signs, & The Village
 2 – Frank Oz – In & Out & The Stepford Wives

Filmography

Film

Television

Theatre 
Work as a Costume Designer

Awards and nominations 

Academy Awards

Emmy Awards

Tony Awards

References

External links

Ann Roth profile at Variety

American costume designers
Best Costume Design Academy Award winners
Best Costume Design BAFTA Award winners
People from Hanover, Pennsylvania
1931 births
Living people
Tony Award winners
Carnegie Mellon University College of Fine Arts alumni
Women costume designers